Lahore Bar Association is a professional organization of lawyers in Lahore, Pakistan. Its members historically played a major role in the Pakistani independence movement.

See also
 Punjab Bar Council
 Lahore High Court Bar Association
 Pakistan Bar Council
 Lahore High Court

References

Punjab Bar Council